The Clearwater Public Library System (CPLS) is a public library system with five branches that provides service to the citizens of Clearwater, Florida and Pinellas County. The library system was founded in 1911. It is a member of the Pinellas Public Library Cooperative.

History 

Prior to the opening of the free public library system in 1916, there was the Clearwater Library Association (which was a subscription library) which was founded in 1911. Over the next few years, talks began for the planning of a free public library. Carnegie granted $10,000 for the construction of the first public library. A special tax was used to purchase the site and to fund the maintenance of the building, which would be located on Osceola and Sunset. The building was designed by architect F.J. Kennard of Tampa, and G.A. Miller was awarded the contract for construction. Margaret Duncan was the first librarian (and then Library Director) appointed to the Clearwater Public Library. When Duncan left in 1918, the position was filled in 1920 by Grace Mease. By 1920, over half of the city's population were library cardholders. A few more staff were hired to support daily library duties and maintenance. The Depression years hit the library negatively as it did elsewhere; the resulting budget cuts were both necessary and devastating. When a $40 ceiling repair request was denied by the City Manager, the librarian purchased the supplies and paid someone to repair it for less than $14. The librarian was reimbursed by the City Manager for the expense. Another extreme budget cut led to Mease's dismissal, and assistant Annie Owens was promoted to Library Director, without the pay increase.

Talks within the Library Board to establish a branch for African-American residents dated back to 1917, but did not come to fruition until 1950. The North Greenwood location was opened at Pennsylvania and Cedar Street on March 15, 1950, and was headed by librarian Christine Wigfall Morris. With growth at North Greenwood came the need for a larger site, and a new building was erected in 1962 on Palmetto Street. The Beach Branch was established in July 1961 at 40 Causeway Boulevard, and was then moved to the Pelican Walk Shopping Center in 1999. In 2008, in partnership with the City of Clearwater Parks and Recreation Department, the Beach Branch became a part of the Clearwater Beach Recreation Complex.

The Main Library was expanded in 1939 after space became a major concern, as materials were overflowing the shelves to the floor and the catalog cards were in cardboard boxes. In 1942, again the building was assessed and many repairs and renovations were done. Against recommendations from consultants to demolish the Carnegie building and start new for the Main library, more renovations and an extension by Joseph Lawrence Coggan were completed in 1961. Nancy Zussy came on board as Library Director in 1978, and funding was provided to again renovate and improve the Main Library. Belleair philanthropists Henry and Elizabeth Adler donated $500,000, the City of Clearwater provided $800,000, and there was a $200,000 LSCA grant. Finally, in July 2000, voters approved the plan build a new Main Library, which was designed by Robert A.M. Stern, Dean of the Yale University School of Architecture. The grand opening was May 1, 2004.

The Countryside Branch was moved to a new facility in 2015 and the East Branch was also relocated in 2018. The Countryside Branch is now located next to a recreation complex at 2642 Sabal Springs Dr. in Clearwater Florida. The East Branch has changed its name to the Clearwater East Community Library, and is located on the Clearwater St. Petersburg College campus. It is a joint-use facility open to both student and public patrons.

Current Services

Holdings 
The Clearwater Public Library System maintains a collection of books, e-books and e-audiobooks, music, DVDs, and video games. In addition to those items, access is expanded via services such as reserves within the wider Pinellas Public Library Cooperative and well as access to Overdrive and Hoopla, services that allow patrons to check out ebooks and digital audiobooks. The library system also subscribes to databases that provide patrons with 24-7 access to journals, articles, and abstracts under several categories.

In 2017, CPLS established the Thingamabrary collection, which consists of nonstandard items available for check out by the public. Thingamabrary holdings consists of items like ukuleles, tools, tech kits, board games, and bike locks.

The Clearwater Public Library System contains archives of historical local newspapers and photographs. The library also offers an archive of local historical yearbooks and city directories.

In addition to these services, the Clearwater Public Library System also offers Maker Studios. These are makerspaces where patrons can design, create, and explore using library equipment, software, and resources. The Clearwater Main Library and the Clearwater Countryside Library are the two homes of the Maker Studios. The Clearwater Main Library offers four different Maker Studios: the Creation Studio for Arts and Design, the Discovery Studio of Creative Learning, the Innovation Studio of Technology and Business, and the Heritage Studio of Community Memory. Each offers classes, drop-in sessions, and one-on-one training. The Countryside Library has the Maker Studio titled Studio@Countryside, which offers computers with digital arts, video and audio post-production, and office productivity software. This studio requires a reservation.

Branches

References

External links 
 Clearwater Public Library Website
 Pinellas Memory - Clearwater Public Library System Online Archive

Public libraries in Florida
Clearwater, Florida